Dino Lenny (born Dino Anthony Lanni) is an Italian DJ, singer, record producer and record label owner (Frenetica), known on the global dance scene for 20 years.

Career
Growing up playing in the biggest European clubs - Axis, Space, Amnesia, Goa, The Egg, Ministry of Sound – he gained success thanks to remixes and collaborations with INXS, Planet Funk, Underworld, The Housemartins, Scissor Sisters and many others.

In 1999, as a member of the short-lived project Atlantis ITA, Dino Lenny and musical partner Michele Guidi released "In The Next Life" a remix of So Get Up, a 1992 vocal-poem song by Californian songwriter Ithaka (or Ithaka Darin Pappas). The track, which utilized Ithaka's original 1992 vocal, was included in the soundtrack of the 2000 British thriller film Sorted directed by Alexander Jovy along with renowned musical acts such as; Leftfield, Morcheeba, Public Enemy, Elvis Presley and Depeche Mode.

The song was played during the closing titles sequence of the film, ending the entire film with Ithaka Darin Pappas' acapella line, "I'll See You In The Next Life".
Although other mixes of "So Get Up" had previously charted in the United Kingdom, once in 1995 (at #84 as "So Get Up" remixed by Underground Sound of Lisbon) and again in 1997 (at #17 as "Get Up! Go Insane" as reworked by Stretch & Vern), however after appearing in the film, Atlantis ITA's In The Next Life modern trance interpretation charted the song a third time in the UK at #96 in May 2001.

After being among the “Essential New Tunes" of Pete Tong on BBC Radio 1, Lenny started singing in 2005. The British press defined his style as a mixture between Talking Heads and Ian Dury. Later on Lenny was invited by Hardage to take part in his project which included Jocelyn Brown, Maxi Priest, Level 42 and Peter Gabriel.

In 2007, Lenny released the single "Feels Like Home", together with Meck who took care of the production (with Simon Duffy) and the vocals. The track entered the Top 40 of the UK Singles Chart and was A-listed on BBC Radio One. The song was on the soundtrack for Wembley Stadium's opening event; the FA Cup final between Manchester United and Chelsea.

A few months later, Madonna used "Feels Like Home" in a mashup with "Like a Prayer", and performed the new version in 80 countries across the world within the Sticky & Sweet Tour in 2008/09, creating "Feels Like a Prayer".

Current releases
Lenny remixed Missy Elliott and Timbaland's "Get Involved" for the Ministry Of Sound and "Static Revenger" for Toolroom, and will soon release his new album Music Is Killing Piracy which contains collaborations with Tiësto, Mark Knight, Benny Benassi, TV Rock, Francesco Farfa, Piatto, Meck, Jose Amnesia and his musical partner Simon Duffy.

Partial discography
A partial discography can be found at Discogs and his own website.

References

Year of birth missing (living people)
Living people
Italian dance musicians
Italian record producers
Italian DJs
Electronic dance music DJs